Off with His Head is a detective novel by Ngaio Marsh; it is the nineteenth novel to feature Roderick Alleyn. It was first published in the USA (by Little, Brown of Boston) in 1956, under the title Death of a Fool, and in the UK (by Collins) in 1957.

Set in the freezing, snowbound Winter of a small English village, Mardian (based on the Kent village of Birling, where Marsh had recently stayed with her old friends, the Rhodes family), the plot concerns the annual performance in the courtyard of the local crumbling castle of an historic folkloric ritual, "The Dance of the Five Sons", containing elements of Morris dancing, sword dance and Mummers play. This fictional version of the English Guiser/Mummers play, performed on "Sword Wednesday" of the Winter Solstice, includes carefully detailed characters: "The Fool", "Crack" The Hobbyhorse and the half-man/half-woman "Betty". Marsh is clearly fascinated by the idea, put forward in the novel by her detective, Roderick Alleyn, that "The Dance of the Five Sons" (traditionally performed by the local blacksmith and his sons, and during which the murder is committed) is a folkloric blueprint or ur-text for Shakespeare's King Lear, a play Marsh greatly admired and herself directed in New Zealand in 1956.

While sitting comfortably within the "classic puzzle whodunit" form of which Ngaio Marsh was so outstanding an exponent, the novel is highly unusual in its subject matter: England's ancient folkloric rituals in a modern and fast-changing world.

Plot
South East England freezes under the coldest winter on record, as Mrs Anna Bünz, an eccentric German folklore enthusiast, drives from her Worcestershire home to the tiny village of Mardian, in search of "The Dance of the Five Sons", a folkloric survival incorporating in uniquely rich profusion all the elements of English Morris, sword dance, guising and mumming. Given short shrift at Mardian Castle by the eccentric 94-year-old chatelaine, Dame Alice Mardian, and her inbred spinster daughter Dulcie, Mrs Bünz puts up at the village pub and sets out to study and witness the Winter Solstice ritual, which is fiercely protected by old William Andersen, owner of the local forge, who dominates tyrannically his five sons (whose Christian names spell D-A-N-C-E) and who traditionally enact the village's mumming ritual. He repels Mrs Bünz furiously, seeing as an ill omen her attempted female intrusion on an ancient, instinctively understood male tradition. Andersen's granddaughter Camilla, a young actress, is also staying at the pub, hoping to reconnect with the family who rejected her mother for marrying outside her class and community. Camilla is being courted assiduously by Ralph Stayne, the local vicar's son and Dame Alice's nephew (and heir), who has enjoyed a no-bones-broken affair with the pub landlady and has a key role in the mumming play. Hovering uncomfortably around this class hierarchy is an affably boozy ex-RAF hero who runs the local garage and also has a key role in the mumming play.

When the Sword Wednesday play finally takes place, tensions have mounted around the small community, especially at The Forge, where William Andersen's 'simple' youngest son Ernie is desperate to take over his father's starring role as Fool. Mrs Bünz contrives to see the play, during the performance of which, the Fool (William Andersen), theatrically 'beheaded' by the Five Sons at the end of the Sword Dance, fails to 'rise from the dead' and is found horrifically decapitated for real in the bloodstained snow. Alleyn and Fox arrive from Scotland Yard to investigate. The solution ingeniously draws together the story's fundamental fascination with English folkloric traditions and the rapidly changing world that is impinging on Mardian's long-established, rigidly class-oriented life, as represented by William Andersen and Dame Alice. A defining episode is Alleyn's dinner-jacketed attendance at a dismally-cooked formal dinner (with superb old wines from the cellar), hosted by Dame Alice in the icy-cold, crumbling Mardian Castle, where Alleyn is given the family document describing the old mumming ritual, providing the key clue to who has murdered William Andersen, and why.

Commentary

During one of her prolonged visits to England, Ngaio Marsh spent the exceptionally cold winter of 1954-5 snowed in at Birling Place in Kent, the home of her old New Zealand friends, the aristocratic Rhodes family, who were the source of so many experiences that informed Marsh's writing. This, according to Marsh's first biographer, was the inspiration for Mardian and Off With His Head, which she started writing in 1955, while living in a rented home in London's Hans Place. Dr Lewis writes that the novel's background was very carefully researched (as was Ngaio Marsh's habit) and that "her library in Christchurch contains several reference books on folk dance and ancient customs." Ngaio Marsh was characteristically self-doubting and modest as she submitted the manuscript to her London agent Edmund Cork: "I'm in such a stew over it, not knowing if it's deadly dull or passable." Most readers would agree with Dr Lewis that Off With His Head "is an unusual novel and deserves better than categorisation as simply another piece of formula fiction... [T]he enduring nature of the ancient village and its pagan rites is ultimately more memorable than the routine task of identifying a murderer."

Class and snobbery
The Golden Age English whodunit, with its eternal country house parties, dressing for dinner and elegantly convoluted murders, solved by detectives of unimpeachably upper class origin, manners and sympathies, has been accused by readers, reviewers and critics, famously including Q. D. Leavis, Raymond Chandler and Colin Watson of rampant snobbery. As one of the four acknowledged English 'Queens of Crime' (along with Dorothy L Sayers, Margery Allingham and Agatha Christie), Ngaio Marsh has come in for her share of this complaint.

Reviewing Marsh's 1955 Scales of Justice (which preceded Off With His Head), the New Statesman critic acknowledged her "magnificent workmanship" but found her books "often heavily loaded with crudely snobbish class consciousness". Marsh biographer Margaret Lewis refers to a filed BBC memo rejecting a radio dramatisation of Scales of Justice as suffering from "appalling snobbishness". Dr Lewis goes on to comment that "a truer reading of the novel would be that the appalling snobbishness is accurately depicted and firmly ridiculed by the author". Ngaio Marsh certainly fell under the spell of the glamorously aristocratic Rhodes family, who remained lifelong friends, giving her access to the privileged world of the English upper class, which Marsh drew on in many of her novels, notably Death in a White Tie (1938) and Swing Brother Swing (1947), but as early as 1941, her Surfeit of Lampreys (an unmistakably affectionate tribute to the Rhodes family to whom it is dedicated) already shows clear signs of criticism of the charmingly feckless Lampreys' values and lifestyle. This is even more apparent in Swing Brother Swing (1947), which in some respects reads as if it were written and set before World War Two.

As the years went on, Ngaio Marsh's novels revealed a growing disaffection with the eccentricities, charm, irresponsibility and (in some cases) lack of integrity of the English upper classes and their way of life, even when she continued to set her murder mysteries amongst them. Scales of Justice is a notable instance, with the Lacklanders of Swevinings coming in for some ruthless and well-deserved criticism from Alleyn and other characters. This authorial view can be identified, too, in Off With His Head and Hand in Glove (1962), along with other later Ngaio Marsh novels.

References

Roderick Alleyn novels
1957 British novels
Locked-room mysteries
Collins Crime Club books
British detective novels